The Fox Hunt  is a Silly Symphonies animated Disney short film. It was released in 1931.

Plot
It's morning in the English countryside and time for the gentry to participate in their favorite sport: the fox hunt.

Voice cast
 Horse: Richard Edwards

Home media
The short was released on December 19, 2006, on Walt Disney Treasures: More Silly Symphonies, Volume Two.

References

External links
 

American animated short films
1931 short films
1930s Disney animated short films
Silly Symphonies
Films about hunters
Animated films about foxes
Films about skunks
Films directed by Wilfred Jackson
Films produced by Walt Disney
1931 animated films
1931 films
American black-and-white films
Animated films without speech
Columbia Pictures short films
Columbia Pictures animated short films
1930s American films